Urozhayny is a rural locality (a settlement) in Komsomolsky Selsoviet, Pavlovsky District, Altai Krai, Russia. The population was 463 as of 2013. There are 8 streets.

Geography 
Urozhayny is located 18 km southeast of Pavlovsk (the district's administrative centre) by road. Prutskoy is the nearest rural locality.

References 

Rural localities in Pavlovsky District, Altai Krai